The  Spanish Constitution of 1837  was the constitution of Spain from 1837 to 1845. Its principal legacy was to restore the most progressive features of the Spanish Constitution of 1812 and to entrench the concepts of constitutionalism, parliamentarism, and separation of powers in Spain.

Development and characteristics 
In 1836 a coup by sergeants of the Spanish Royal Guard at La Granja de San Ildefonso (Province of Segovia) obliged the regent Maria Christina of the Two Sicilies to name a government dominated by the Progressive Party. That government initially superseded the Royal Statute of 1834 by reinstating the Constitution of 1812 (the "Cádiz Constitution"), and called a Constituent Cortes that was also dominated by Progressives, to develop the new Constitution of 1837. 

Despite this Progressive domination of the process, the resulting constitution was roughly intermediate between the Cádiz Constitution and the Royal Statute of 1834, in hopes of gaining support from the Moderate Party as well. Some of the similarities to the Cádiz Constitution were the principle of national sovereignty, the recognition of a range of rights for citizens, division of powers, an increased role for the Cortes (legislature) and limitations on royal power. On the other hand, the parliament (the Cortes) was similar in structure to that of France or Belgium at the time, with a broad electorate choosing a lower house (the Chamber of Deputies), while the upper house (the Senate) was appointed by the monarch. The monarch had the power to convoke and dissolve the Cortes. Rather than universal suffrage, a system of censitary suffrage limited the franchise to those who paid taxes of at least 200 reales, which is to say about five percent of the population. 

In 1845, under the Moderates, Spain replaced the Constitution of 1837 with a new constitution; one of the main differences was that the Constitution of 1845 narrowed the franchise to less than one percent of the population.

References

External links

  Text of the Spanish Constitution of 1837
  Constitution Of Spain] (in English) 

Constitutions of Spain
1837 in law
Constitution
Spain 1837
Constitution of 1837
1837 documents